Zardin Gar may refer to:
 Zardin Gar, Khash
 Zardin Gar, Mehrestan